Nojeva barka (trans. "Noah's Ark") is the fourteenth studio album from Serbian and former Yugoslav rock band Riblja Čorba, released in 1999.

The album's biggest hits were its title track, "Gastarbjaterska 2", "Care" (which criticizes Slobodan Milošević and Socialist Party of Serbia), and the ballad "Princ". The song "16 noći" is a Serbian language cover of Merle Travis' song "Sixteen Tons", Riblja Čorba version dealing with phone sex. The music for the song "Gde si" was written by a former Riblja Čorba member and Bajaga i Instruktori frontman Momčilo Bajagić, who also sang backing vocals on the song.

Album cover
The album cover was designed by Jugoslav Vlahović.

Track listing

Personnel
Bora Đorđević - vocals
Vidoja Božinović - guitar
Miša Aleksić - bass guitar, producer
Vicko Milatović - drums
Vladimir Barjaktarević - keyboards

Additional personnel
Željko Savić - acoustic guitar, backing vocals
Momčilo Bajagić - backing vocals
Saša Đokić - bass guitar
Branko Marušić - harmonica
Mirko Tomić - pedal steel guitar, resonator guitar
Srđan Đaković - trumpet
Slavoljub Kolarević - saxophone
Milan Popović - producer
Dragutin Jakovljević - recorded by
Oliver Jovanović - mastered by

References 
Nojeva barka at Discogs
 EX YU ROCK enciklopedija 1960-2006,  Janjatović Petar;  
 Riblja čorba,  Jakovljević Mirko;

External links 
Nojeva barka at Discogs

Riblja Čorba albums
1999 albums
Hi-Fi Centar albums